Afghanistan competed at the 1956 Summer Olympics in Melbourne, after having missed the 1952 Games in Helsinki.
They only sent a team of 12 to compete in the field hockey, of which six of the competitors competed at the 1948 Summer Olympics.

Field Hockey

Squad
Head coach:

Group A

Group standings

India advanced to the semi-finals.

References

 

Nations at the 1956 Summer Olympics
1956
1956 in Afghan sport